Project Mooncircle is an independent record label based in Berlin, Germany, focusing on organic and electronic music.

History 

Project Mooncircle was founded in 2002 by Gordon Gieseking, as an offshoot of experimental electronic Miami label Beta Bodega. In 2004 Gieseking formed a partnership with the vinyl and clothing mail-order company Hip Hop Vinyl, and when Beta Bodega ceased operations in 2005, Project Mooncircle became HHV.DE's official imprint.
Respectively in 2009 and 2010, Project Mooncircle took up two sub-labels, dub techno imprint Project Squared and blog/label Finest Ego, and in 2014 it was featured in the XLR8R readers poll on the best independent record labels, behind Ninja Tune and Warp Records.

Alumni / current artists 

1000 Names
40 Winks
Barnaby Carter
Barrio Lindo
Blossom
CYNE
Daisuke Tanabe
Daixie
Darius Vaikas
DDay One
Deceptikon
Deft
Disc System meets Inner Science
DZA
Erik Luebs
Empt
Fat Jon The Ample Soul Physician
Flako
Glen Porter
Good Paul
Graciela Maria
Groeni
Hanami
IIIII (Five Eyes)
Jahbitat
Jilk
Joe Kickass
John Lamonica
John Robinson
Kidkanevil
KRTS
Kwala
Lambent
Lewis Parker
Lomovolokno
Long arm
Manuvers
Mathematik
Mau'lin
memotone
Michal Lewicki
Mike Gao
Monsoonsiren
Mr Cooper
My Panda Shall Fly
Non Genetic Of Shadow Huntaz
Nuage
Obba Supa aka Teknical Development & Hey!zeus
Olof Melander
Parra For Cuva
Pavel Dovgal
The Q4 – The Quadraphonic Quartet.
Rain Dog
The Range
Red Baron
Robot Koch
Rumpistol
Sekuoia
Senoy
Sieren
Shahmen
Soosh
Strand
Submerse
Sweatson Klank
Szenario
Tendts
Tom Diciccio
Walrus Ghost

References

External links

Electronic dance music record labels
Drum and bass record labels
Electronic music record labels
Experimental music record labels
Hip hop record labels